The Spider’s House is a novel by Paul Bowles and first published by Random House in 1955.

The third of the author’s four novels, The Spider’s House is his only work that encompasses a contemporary political crisis: the struggle for  Moroccan independence from French colonial rule during the 1950s.

Plot
The story is set during the 1950s in the city of Fez, Morocco during the nationalist uprising against French colonial rule. The holy month of Ramadan is underway. A middle-aged American writer and expatriate, Stenham, resides in the then Medieval-like city. A former Communist, Stenhm is disillusioned with the party, and equally hostile to the French colonialist occupiers. He lives an existence of alienation. Another denizen of the city, the poor 15-year-old Arab boy, Amar, supports the rebellion. Through the actions of a well-to-do English painter and an American divorcee, the lives of Stenham and Amar become enmeshed in the social upheavals that engulf the city.

Publication Background

The Spider’s House was written largely while Bowles was sojourning in Tangiers during 1954, and completed in  Ceylon in 1955. 
Bowles reported that his approach to writing the novel differed sharply from his method for his first two novels, The Sheltering Sky (1949) and Let It Come Down (1952):

Critic Virginia Spencer Carr reports that Bowles was concerned that the manuscript he submitted for publication “lacked certain melodramatic flourishes to which his readers had become accustomed.”  John Lehmann, his British agent and publisher, complained that the novel was “very slow moving, a problem I attribute in part to the central character’s being an Arab boy who is neither interesting nor active enough to bear the weight that is put upon him . . . It was a little sentimental and unconvincing.”

The third of his four novels, The Spider’s House was published by Random House in 1955. The British edition appeared in 1957, published by  McDonald. Black Sparrow Press issued an American reprint in 1986.

Critical Assessment

Literary critic Charles J. Rolo praised The Spider’s House for possessing elements of “a first-class political thriller” but added that “the plot meanders all over the place, accumulating sound and fury and signifying precious little in terms of political ideas or anything else.”

Despite these shortcomings, the novel offers a “vivid fidelity and richness of detail with which it re-creates the Arab scene...Bowles has certainly made the explosive city of Fez come powerfully to life.”

Theme and Style

The Spider’s House has been widely recognized as the most “political” of Bowles’s novels. The story is set in Fez during the Moroccan nationalist uprisings of the 1950s. Literary critic Francine Prose, writing in 2002, shortly after the U.S. occupation of Afghanistan, and just before the  U. S. invasion of Iraq in 2003 wrote:

Though occurring in the context of political turmoil, Bowles’s nihilistic and misanthropic outlook persists throughout the novel. Literary critic Conrad Knickerbocker observes:

Charles J. Rolo comments on the reactionary political outlook of the character Stenham (“the character who comes closest, one might argue, to being a stand-in for the author”):

Footnotes

Sources 
Hibbard, Allen. 1993. Paul Bowles: A Study of the Short Fiction. Twayne Publishers. New York. 
Knickerbocker, Conrad. 1966. The Destruction of Innocence. The New York Times. 12 March,1966. https://archive.nytimes.com/www.nytimes.com/books/98/05/17/specials/bowles-world.html
 Prose, Francine. 2002. The Coldest Eye: acting badly among the Arabs. Harper’s Magazine. March, 2002. https://harpers.org/archive/2002/03/the-coldest-eye/  Retrieved 10 July, 2022.
Pulsifer, Gary. 1999. Much-traveled American writer and composer who made his home in Morocco, the setting for his best-known novel, The Sheltering Sky. The Guardian. 19 November, 1999. https://www.theguardian.com/books/1999/nov/19/news.obituaries Retrieved 26 July, 2022.
Rolo, Charles J. 1955. Tension in Morocco. https://archive.nytimes.com/www.nytimes.com/books/98/05/17/specials/bowles-spider.html?_r=2&oref=slogin Retrieved 25 July, 2022.
 Tóibín, Colm. 2007. Avoid the Orient. Review, Paul Bowles: A Life, by Virginia Spencer Carr. London Review of Books,  Vol. 29 No. 1, 04 January, 2007. https://www.lrb.co.uk/the-paper/v29/n01/colm-toibin/avoid-the-orient Retrieved 11 July, 2022.

1955 American novels
Fez, Morocco
Novels by Paul Bowles
Novels set in Morocco
Novels set in the 1950s
Random House books